Pattipola is a village that is mostly located in Badulla District, Uva Province with a small portion in Nuwara Eliya District of Central Province, Sri Lanka.

Transport 

Pattipola is served by the Pattipola railway station of the Sri Lanka Railways on the Main Line. Pattipola Tunnel is also located near Pattipola. It is the third longest and the highest railway tunnel in Sri Lanka.

References

External links

Populated places in Badulla District
Populated places in Nuwara Eliya District